Big Rooster is a chain of fast food restaurants in Papua New Guinea that specialises in roast chicken. The company began operations in 1987. As of 1992, it was part of a Queensland-based Australian chain of the same name which had four stores in Papua New Guinea. That year the chain was purchased by Coles Myer and its Australian operations were rebranded to become part of the Red Rooster chain. 

As of July 2017, Big Rooster had 20 stores across Papua New Guinea.

References

Fast-food poultry restaurants
Companies of Papua New Guinea
Restaurants established in 1987